Stefanos Basinas (born 23 October 1968) is a retired Greek football midfielder.

References

1968 births
Living people
Greek footballers
Levadiakos F.C. players
Kallithea F.C. players
Ethnikos Asteras F.C. players
Apollon Smyrnis F.C. players
Chalkida F.C. players
Super League Greece players
Association football midfielders
People from Euboea (regional unit)
Footballers from Central Greece